May Lee-Yang, also known as May Lee, is a Hmong American playwright, poet, prose writer, performance artist and community activist in Saint Paul, Minnesota, United States.  She was born in Ban Vinai Refugee Camp in Thailand and moved to Minnesota as a child with her family.  She is also the executive director of the non-profit organization Hmong Arts Connection.

Theater

Her theater-based works include Confessions of a Lazy Hmong Woman, Sia(b), Ten Reasons Why I'd Be a Bad Porn Star, Stir-Fried Pop Culture, and The Child's House.  Her work has been produced through Mu Performing Arts, the Center for Hmong Art and Talent (CHAT), Out North Theater, Kaotic Good Productions, Intermedia Arts, and the Minnesota Fringe Festival as well as toured to various locations around the Midwest.

Writing

Her writing has appeared in the Paj Ntaub Voice Hmong literary journal, The Saint Paul Almanac (Arcata Press), Cheers to Muses: Contemporary Works by Asian American Women (Asian American Women Association), To Sing Along the Way: Minnesota Women Poets From Pre-Territorial Days to the Present (New Rivers Press), Fiction on a Stick (Milkweed Editions) Unarmed, the Bamboo Among the Oaks anthology (Borealis Press), Water~Stone Literary Review (Hamline University), Sounds In This House: An Anthology from the National Book Foundation Writing Camp (National Book Foundation", and Hmong Movement.

Performance work

She was a member of the Hmong and Lao spoken word group, F.I.R.E. (Free Inspiring Rising Elements) and performed regularly at several Minnesota venues including the Fringe Festival, Intermedia Arts, Hmong Fest, Patrick’s Cabaret, the Loft Literary Center, and local universities and colleges.

May Lee-Yang has also been an actress and performed for Pom Siab Hmoob Theatre (currently a part of the Center for Hmong Arts and Talent) in the play, Hmong Tapestry: Voices from the Cloth.  Venues for the play included schools, college campuses, conferences, and community sites throughout Minnesota, Wisconsin, and Kansas from 1997 through 2001.

Selected awards

 Midwestern Voices and Vision Artist Residency administered through the Alliance of Artists Communities (2010)
 Minnesota State Arts Board Artist Initiative Grant for Theater (2009) and Literature (2005)
 National Performance Network Creation Fund Grant for Theater (2008)
 Intermedia Arts/Jerome Foundation's Naked Stages Fellowship (2008)
 Playwright Center Many Voices Fellowship (2008, 2002)
 The Loft Literary Center's Mentorship Program in Creative Non-Fiction (2005)
 University of Minnesota's Anna Augusta Von Helmholtz-Phelan Award for Creative Writing (2001)

References

External links
 May Lee Yang official website
May Lee Yang Interview
May Lee Yang and VISION article in Hmong Today
May Lee Yang article in Hmong Times
 3 Minute Egg Coverage of May Lee-Yang's work
 TC Daily Planet Interviews May Lee-Yang about the Midwestern Voices and Visions Residency Award
 Pioneer Press review of "Sia(b)"

Hmong writers
Living people
Hmong activists
American people of Hmong descent
American writers of Hmong descent
Year of birth missing (living people)
21st-century American women writers